Newport Roundhouse, formerly known as Newport Town Hall, is a Grade II listed building located in Newport, Launceston, Cornwall. It is owned and maintained by Launceston Town Council. 
The Roundhouse was built in 1829 by the Duke of Northumberland to house the remains of the Market Cross, which was a granite monolith cross of unknown design. Only the stump of the cross remains today. Election results for Newport's Parliamentary Seats were announced at this site, Newport, Cornwall was a rotten borough prior to 1832. The building was restored and had seats added by the town council in 1923. These seats were removed in 2005, when the building was restored again.

References

Grade II listed buildings in Cornwall
Launceston, Cornwall